María Isabel Ortíz Mantilla (born 3 September 1975) is a Mexican politician affiliated with the PAN. She currently serves as Secretary of Environment and territorial order at Guanajuato State.

References

1975 births
Living people
People from Puebla (city)
Women members of the Chamber of Deputies (Mexico)
Members of the Chamber of Deputies (Mexico)
National Action Party (Mexico) politicians
21st-century Mexican politicians
21st-century Mexican women politicians
Deputies of the LXII Legislature of Mexico